Prince Mohammed Bin Salman College of Business and Entrepreneurship (MBSC) is a co-ed higher education business administration college in King Abdullah Economic City, Makkah Region, Saudi Arabia. It is the first college in Saudi Arabia which offers postgraduate degree as well as executive education. The college was named after its founder, the then deputy crown prince Mohammed bin Salman.

Establishment
The college was inaugurated on 17 June 2016 and the inauguration was attended by the then Deputy Crown Prince Mohammed Bin Salman himself.

The agreement for the establishment of MBSC was signed in Washington, D.C. by Badr Al-Asaker, secretary-general of the Mohammed Bin Salman Foundation (MISK); Fahd Al-Rasheed, group CEO and MD of KAEC and vice president of the board of trustees of the college; and Kerry Healey, president of Babson College.

Prince Mohammed Bin Salman College of Business and Entrepreneurship was established through an international partnership between Emaar The Economic City, Babson Global (a wholly owned subsidiary of Babson College , US), Lockheed Martin  under the umbrella of the Economic Offset Program in Saudi Arabia  and the MiSK Foundation.

Partnership
Prince Mohammed Bin Salman College (MBSC) of Business & Entrepreneurship was launched as a new private, higher education institution for both men and women. It was established through an international partnership between Emaar The Economic City, Babson Global (a wholly owned subsidiary of Babson College, USA), Lockheed Martin under the umbrella of the Economic Offset Program in the Kingdom of Saudi Arabia and the MISK foundation.

MoU with Saudi Commission for Health Specialities
In November 2020, MBSC signed a 
memorandum of understanding with the Saudi Commission for Health Specialties, a scientific commission under the Ministry of Health to promote and enhance professional practice of health leadership and a step towards improving Saudi Arabia's health care sector.

Graduation of the first batch
The college graduated the first batch of 93 MBA students in May 2019

References

Business schools in Saudi Arabia
Babson College
Mecca Province